José Jorge Letria OL (born June 8, 1951) is a Portuguese poet, writer and musician. He is the current president of Sociedade Portuguesa de Autores.

Awards 
He has received the UNESCO International Prize, the Eça de Queiroz Prize and received the Guerra Junqueiro Literary Prize in 2019.

References 

Portuguese male poets
Portuguese musicians
1951 births
Living people